"Already it's Heaven" is a song written by Billy Sherrill and Glenn Sutton, and recorded by American country music artist David Houston.  It was released in May 1968 as the second single and title track from the album Already It's Heaven.  The single was Houston's sixteenth release on the country charts.  "Already It's Heaven" spent one week at the top of the country charts and total of fifteen weeks on the chart.

Chart performance

References

1968 singles
David Houston (singer) songs
Songs written by Billy Sherrill
Songs written by Glenn Sutton
Song recordings produced by Billy Sherrill
Epic Records singles
1968 songs